Eric James Anderson (4 April 1931 – 27 July 2014) was a New Zealand rugby union player and coach. Originally a lock, Anderson represented Bay of Plenty at a provincial level, and was a member of the New Zealand national side, the All Blacks, in 1960, playing as a prop. He played 10 matches for the All Blacks but did not make any test appearances. He later became the coach of the Bay of Plenty team, taking them to the inaugural NPC first division title in 1976.

References

External links
 

1931 births
2014 deaths
Rugby union players from Whakatāne
New Zealand rugby union players
New Zealand international rugby union players
Bay of Plenty rugby union players
Rugby union locks
Rugby union props
New Zealand rugby union coaches
People educated at Te Puke High School